Príncipe de Asturias (English: Prince of Asturias) is the title given to the heir to the Spanish throne. It may also refer to:

Geography
Príncipe de Asturias Peak, a 4680 m peak in Vinson Massif, Sentinel Range in Ellsworth Mountains, Antarctica,

Ships
Spanish aircraft carrier Principe de Asturias, an aircraft carrier of the Spanish Navy, launched in 1982 and scrapped in 2017
Spanish ship Principe de Asturias (1784), a three deck 112 gun ship launched in 1784 and scrapped in 1817
Príncipe de Asturias (ocean liner), a Spanish liner launched in 1914 and sunk off Brazil with heavy loss of life in 1916

See also
Asturias (disambiguation)